Cacouna is a Maliseet First Nations reserve in Quebec, physically located within the Rivière-du-Loup Regional County Municipality (though not juridically part of it). It is surrounded by the city of the same name.

It is the smallest reserve in Canada, with an area of only 0.17 hectares (0.42 acres, or 18,300 square feet).  It is not permanently inhabited.

External links
 The Maliseet Nation
 Profile at Aboriginal Canada Portal
 Statistics Canada, 2006 census (not listed in 2011 census)
 Maps found for Cacouna Indian Reserve No. 22

References

Indian reserves in Quebec
Maliseet